Ardakhshir II (also spelled Artaxerxes II) was king of Persis in the 1st century BC, a vassal state of the Parthian Empire. An inscription written in Middle Persian on a silver cup bears his name. He was succeeded by Wahsir.

References

Sources 
 .
 
 
 
 

Year of death unknown
Year of birth unknown
1st-century BC rulers in Asia
1st-century BC Iranian people
Zoroastrian rulers
Kings of Persis